The 2014–15 Tennessee State Tigers basketball team represented Tennessee State University during the 2014–15 NCAA Division I men's basketball season. The Tigers, led by first year head coach Dana Ford, played their home games at the Gentry Complex and were members of the East Division of the Ohio Valley Conference. They finished the season 5–26, 2–14 in OVC play to finish in last place in the East Division. They failed to qualify for the OVC Tournament.

Roster

Schedule

|-
!colspan=9 style="background:#0000FF; color:#FFFFFF;"| Regular Season

References

Tennessee State Tigers basketball seasons
Tennessee State
Tennessee State Tigers basketball
Tennessee State Tigers basketball